Uzak (Distant in North America) is a 2002 Turkish drama film written, produced, shot and directed by Nuri Bilge Ceylan.

The film won a total of 31 awards at various film festivals, including Best Actor at Cannes, Special Jury Prize at Chicago, and Best Balkan Movie at Sofia International Film Festival.

Plot
Uzak tells the story of Yusuf (Mehmet Emin Toprak), a young factory worker who loses his job and travels to Istanbul to stay with his relative Mahmut (Muzaffer Özdemir) while looking for a job. Mahmut is a relatively wealthy and intellectual photographer, whereas Yusuf is almost illiterate, uneducated, and unsophisticated. The two do not get along well. Yusuf assumes that he will easily find work as a sailor, but there are no jobs, and he has no sense of direction or energy. Meanwhile, Mahmut, despite his wealth, is aimless too: his job, which consists of photographing tiles, is dull and inartistic, he can barely express emotions towards his ex-wife or his lover, and while he pretends to enjoy intellectual filmmakers like Andrei Tarkovsky, he switches channels to watch porn as soon as Yusuf leaves the room.

Mahmut attempts to bond with Yusuf and recapture his love of art by taking him on a drive to photograph the beautiful Turkish countryside, but the attempt is a failure on both counts. At the end of the film, Yusuf leaves without telling Mahmut, who is left to sit by the docks, watching the ships on his own.

Cast
 Muzaffer Özdemir as Mahmut
 Mehmet Emin Toprak as Yusuf
 Zuhal Gencer as Nazan (as Zuhal Gencer Erkaya)
 Nazan Kirilmis as Lover
 Feridun Koc as Janitor
 Fatma Ceylan as Mother

Production
Ceylan made the film with a team of 5 people, and stated that he found the body of the French teacher on the upper floor of the apartment where he lived, thus he was very affected by this incident and included in the film.

Uzak was the last film that the actor Mehmet Emin Toprak would be involved with, as he died in a car accident soon after filming was completed. He was 28 years old.

Reception
Distant has been acclaimed by critics. On Rotten Tomatoes, the film has an approval rating of 87%, based on 46 reviews, with an average rating of 7.8/10. The site's critical consensus reads, "Hauntingly beautiful, Distant communicates volumes with its almost pervasive silence." On Metacritic, the film has an average score of 84 out of 100, based on 18 critics, indicating "universal acclaim".

Tom Dawson of BBC describes the film as "richly contemplative and languid filmmaking" and added "Few recent films have been so accomplished in capturing the way people drift through their lives, unable to communicate their emotions and feelings."  David Sterritt of The Christian Science Monitor describes it as a "unassuming, acutely observant drama."

Uzak won 17 awards and 2 nominations, including the Grand Prix and Prix d'interprétation masculine, shared by the two lead actors of the film at the 2003 Cannes Film Festival.

In 2019, director Andrew Haigh named it as the best film of the 21st century, praising it as "one of the best about loneliness ever made."

References

External links
 
 
 
 Review of Distant at Blogcritics
 Uzak: A film review

2002 drama films
Films set in Istanbul
Films set in Turkey
Films shot in Turkey
Films directed by Nuri Bilge Ceylan
Golden Orange Award for Best Film winners
Turkish drama films
2002 films
Cannes Grand Prix winners
Films shot in Istanbul
2000s Turkish-language films